The Graduate is the first studio album of MC Lars released on iTunes on February 14, 2006 and in stores on March 21, 2006.

Track listing
 "Download This Song" – 3:44
featuring Jaret Reddick of Bowling for Soup
 "The Roommate from Hell" – 3:18
featuring MC Chris
 "21 Concepts" – 2:49
 "Hot Topic Is Not Punk Rock" – 2:15
featuring The Matches
 "Rapgirl" – 3:03
 "Generic Crunk Rap" – 3:02
 "Ahab" – 3:21
 "iGeneration" – 2:53
 "If I Had a Time Machine, That Would Be Fresh" – 1:03
 "Internet Relationships (Are Not Real Relationships)" – 3:24
featuring A Scholar and a Physician and Piney Gir
 "Space Game" – 4:05
 "The Dialogue" – 2:53
featuring Ill Bill
 "Six Degrees of Kurt Cobain" – 1:44
 "Signing Emo" – 3:37
Bonus tracks

Samples
 "Download This Song" samples "The Passenger" by Iggy Pop.
 The song "21 Concepts" samples music from Tetris. When performed live, the background video includes clips of Mega64's popular Tetris video. Additionally, the lyrics parody the song '99 Problems' by Ice-T.
 The chorus to "Ahab" samples the British band Supergrass performing "Moving" off their self-titled album.
 The song "iGeneration" samples "American Hearts" by Piebald.
 The song "Singing Emo" samples "Cry Tonight" by Hearts That Hate.

References

2006 debut albums
MC Lars albums
Nettwerk Records albums
Albums produced by Mike Sapone